The Dissident Left, commonly named The Pentarchy for its five leaders, was a progressive and radical parliamentary group active in Italy during the last decades of the 19th century.

History 
It emerged in 1880 from the left-wing of the two dominant parliamentary groups, the Historical Left, in opposition to the trasformismo of Agostino Depretis. In the 1880 general election, the party won 19.7% of the vote and 119 seats in the Chamber of Deputies.

The Pentarchy was a group formed led by Francesco Crispi and composed also by Giuseppe Zanardelli, Benedetto Cairoli, Giovanni Nicotera, Agostino Magliani, Alfredo Beccarini and Gabriele D'Annunzio. Initially split from the Left in 1880, this group re-merged in to the Left in 1887.

Ideology 
The Dissident Left supported statist and progressive internal policies, expansionism and Germanophile foreign policies, as well as protectionist economy policies. Most of these policies were to be implemented by Francesco Crispi when he became Prime Minister in the 1890s.

Electoral results

References 

Liberal parties in Italy
Social liberal parties
Political parties established in 1880
1880 establishments in Italy
Political parties disestablished in 1887
1887 disestablishments in Italy